Achmad Dimyati Natakusumah (born 17 September 1966) is an Indonesian politician who is a member of the People's Representative Council since 2019, and previously between 2009 and 2018. Natakusumah was also the regent of Pandeglang Regency between 2000 and 2009.

Throughout his legislative career, he briefly served as the deputy speaker of the People's Consultative Assembly, and had been made a suspect in a bribery case although found not guilty. He was initially part of the United Development Party, but he moved to the Prosperous Justice Party in late 2017.

Early life and education
Achmad Dimyati Natakusumah was born in Tangerang on 17 September 1966. He spent his first twelve years of education in Pandeglang, briefly studying in Perth before returning and getting his bachelor's degree in law from Esa Unggul University. Later, he gained a masters from Pasundan University and a doctorate from Padjadjaran University – all in law, and a masters in political science from the University of Indonesia.

Career
Natakusumah had a background in business, and he was the head of West Java's young entrepreneurs' association (HIPMI) between 1995 and 2000. In 2000, he was elected as the regent of Pandeglang, with the support of PDI-P and PPP, the latter of which he was a member of. He was reelected in 2005 for his second term.

While regent, Natakusumah issued a decision which was to mandate the separation of male and female students at high schools, intended to minimize sexual encounters between the teenagers. He also enforced an alcohol ban and funded some free services and public buildings.

He later ran as a legislator in the 2009 Indonesian legislative election in Banten's 1st electoral district with the United Development Party (PPP) and won a seat, becoming part of its third commission and also holding the post of deputy chairman of its legislation committee. Later in 2009, he was arrested by the Banten Attorney for alleged bribery he committed in 2006. He was found not guilty by Pandeglang's State Court in 2010.

In July 2014, Natakusumah was appointed and sworn in as Deputy Speaker for the People's Consultative Assembly, replacing Lukman Hakim Saifuddin who became the Minister of Religious Affairs.

Natakusumah won reelection in the 2014 election, winning 68,353 votes in Jakarta's 3rd electoral district. During a schism in PPP, he sided with Djan Faridz's faction and was named secretary general there, though he moved parties to the Prosperous Justice Party (PKS) in late 2017. Due to this, PPP replaced him in the council with Abdul Aziz.

He ran in the 2019 legislative election under PKS from Banten's 1st electoral district, and was elected back into the legislature.

Family
Natakusumah is married to Irna Narulita, who also served as regent in Pandeglang and a member of the People's Representative Council between 2014 and 2016. Out of the couple's children, three are set to run in the 2019 legislative election, two of which in the same district as Natakusumah while running from different parties (one from the Nasdem Party and one from the Democratic Party).

References 

1966 births
Living people
Indonesian Muslims
Members of the People's Representative Council, 2009
Members of the People's Representative Council, 2014
Mayors and regents of places in Banten
Prosperous Justice Party politicians
United Development Party politicians
Padjadjaran University alumni
University of Indonesia alumni
Members of the People's Representative Council, 2019
Regents of places in Indonesia